Puggy may refer to:

Persons
Irving "Puggy" Feinstein (ca. 1910–1939), New York mobster
Puggy Hunton (1902–1967), American football coach
Puggy Pearson (1929–2006), American professional poker player

Music
Puggy, Belgian musical band

Fictional characters
Puggy, a fictional character in novel Big Trouble

Other uses
Puggy, Scottish slang for a slot machine